Richard Lugo (born May 7, 1973 in Calabozo, Guárico, Venezuela) is a Venezuelan professional basketball player currently signed with Venezuelan team Guaiqueríes de Margarita.

Lugo played one season of NCAA Division I college basketball at St. Francis College in New York.  He averaged 9.5 points, 8.1 rebounds, and 4.5 blocks per game as a freshman starting center for the Terriers. Following this season, he signed as a professional with Panteras de Miranda in Venezuela.

In 20 years as a professional, Lugo has played for several teams in Latin America and had brief stints in Europe and China.  He was the Venezuelan Player of the Year in 1998 and is a four-time member of the Venezuelan All-Defensive Team (2000, 2005–07) and two-time Puerto Rican League Defensive Player of the Year (2003–04). Champion with Capitanes of Arecibo Puerto Rican League in 2005.
Participates with Atleticos San German team Puerto Rican League in 2008.  He was a player of Team Brujos de Guayama in 2007.
Richard Lugo is a member of the Honorary Council of the Federation of Basketball of Venezuela.

Lugo has been a member of the Venezuela national basketball team since 1998.  He competed with the team at the 2002 FIBA World Championship and 2006 FIBA World Championship and was the team's leading rebounder at both tournaments.
2016 Became for life in the Professional Basketball League of Venezuela (LPB) in the player with the most rebounds overcoming itself with more than 6,000 rebounds being the leader until today in the Venezuelan basketball.

References

External links
 

1973 births
Living people
Cangrejeros de Santurce basketball players
Centers (basketball)
Guaiqueríes de Margarita players
Halcones UV Córdoba players
Panteras de Miranda players
People from Calabozo
Śląsk Wrocław basketball players
St. Francis Brooklyn Terriers men's basketball players
Trotamundos B.B.C. players
Venezuelan expatriate basketball people in China
Venezuelan expatriate basketball people in Colombia
Venezuelan expatriate basketball people in Mexico
Venezuelan expatriate basketball people in Poland
Venezuelan expatriate basketball people in Puerto Rico
Venezuelan expatriate basketball people in Spain
Venezuelan men's basketball players
2006 FIBA World Championship players
2002 FIBA World Championship players